Robert Moses (December 18, 1888 – July 29, 1981) was an American urban planner and public official who worked in the New York metropolitan area during the early to mid 20th century. Despite never being elected to any office, Moses is regarded as one of the most powerful and influential individuals in the history of New York City and New York State. The grand scale of his infrastructural projects and his philosophy of urban development influenced a generation of engineers, architects, and urban planners across the United States.

Moses held various positions throughout his more than forty-year long career. He at times held up to 12 titles simultaneously, including New York City Parks Commissioner and Chairman of the Long Island State Park Commission. Having worked closely with New York Governor Al Smith early in his career, Moses became expert in writing laws and navigating and manipulating the inner workings of state government. He created and led numerous semi-autonomous public authorities, through which he controlled millions of dollars in revenue and directly issued bonds to fund new ventures with little outside input or oversight.

Moses's projects transformed the New York area and revolutionized the way cities in the U.S. were designed and built. As Long Island State Park Commissioner, Moses oversaw the construction of Jones Beach State Park, the most visited public beach in the United States, and was the primary architect of the New York State Parkway System. As head of the Triborough Bridge Authority, Moses had near-complete control over bridges and tunnels in New York City as well as the tolls collected from them, and built, among others, the Triborough Bridge, the Brooklyn–Battery Tunnel, and the Throgs Neck Bridge, as well as several major highways. These roadways and bridges, alongside urban renewal efforts that saw the destruction of huge swaths of tenement housing and their replacement with large public housing projects, transformed the physical fabric of New York and inspired other cities to undertake similar development endeavors.

Moses's reputation declined following the publication of Robert Caro's Pulitzer Prize-winning biography The Power Broker (1974), which cast doubt on the purported benefits of many of Moses's projects and further cast Moses as racist. In large part because of The Power Broker, Moses is today considered a controversial figure in the history of New York City.

Early life and career
Moses was born in New Haven, Connecticut, on December 18, 1888, to German Jewish parents, Bella (Silverman) and Emanuel Moses. He spent the first nine years of his life living at 83 Dwight Street in New Haven, two blocks from Yale University. In 1897, the Moses family moved to New York City, where they lived on East 46th Street off Fifth Avenue. Moses's father was a successful department store owner and real estate speculator in New Haven. In order for the family to move to New York City, he sold his real estate holdings and store, then retired. Moses's mother was active in the settlement movement, with her own love of building. Robert Moses and his brother Paul attended several schools for their elementary and secondary education, including the Dwight School and the Mohegan Lake School, a military academy near Peekskill.

After graduating from Yale College (B.A., 1909) and Wadham College, Oxford (B.A., Jurisprudence, 1911; M.A., 1913), and earning a Ph.D. in political science from Columbia University in 1914, Moses became attracted to New York City reform politics. A committed idealist, he developed several plans to rid New York of patronage hiring practices, including being the lead author of a 1919 proposal to reorganize the New York state government. None went very far, but Moses, due to his intelligence, caught the notice of Belle Moskowitz, a friend and trusted advisor to Governor Al Smith.  When the state Secretary of State's position became appointive rather than elective, Smith named Moses. He served from 1927 to 1929.

Moses rose to power with Smith, who was elected as governor in 1922, and set in motion a sweeping consolidation of the New York State government. During that period Moses began his first foray into large-scale public work initiatives, while drawing on Smith's political power to enact legislation. This helped create the new Long Island State Park Commission and the State Council of Parks. In 1924, Governor Smith appointed Moses chairman of the State Council of Parks and president of the Long Island State Park Commission. This centralization allowed Smith to run a government later used as a model for Franklin D. Roosevelt's New Deal federal government. Moses also received numerous commissions that he carried out efficiently, such as the development of Jones Beach State Park. Displaying a strong command of law as well as matters of engineering, Moses became known for his skill in drafting legislation, and was called "the best bill drafter in Albany". At a time when the public was accustomed to Tammany Hall corruption and incompetence, Moses was seen as a savior of government.

Shortly after President Franklin D. Roosevelt's inauguration in 1933, the federal government found itself with millions of New Deal dollars to spend, yet states and cities had few projects ready. Moses was one of the few local officials who had projects shovel ready. For that reason, New York City was able to obtain significant Works Progress Administration (WPA), Civilian Conservation Corps (CCC), and other Depression-era funding. One of his most influential and longest-lasting positions was that of Parks Commissioner of New York City, a role he served from January 18, 1934, to May 23, 1960.

Offices held
The many offices and professional titles that Moses held gave him unusually broad power to shape urban development in the New York metropolitan region. These include, according to the New York Preservation Archive Project:
Long Island State Park Commission (President, 1924–1963)
 New York State Council of Parks (Chairman, 1924–1963)
New York Secretary of State (1927–1928)
 Bethpage State Park Authority (President, 1933–1963)
 Emergency Public Works Commission (Chairman, 1933–1934)
 Jones Beach Parkway Authority (President, 1933–1963)
New York City Department of Parks (Commissioner, 1934–1960)
 Triborough Bridge and Tunnel Authority (Chairman, 1934–1968)
 New York City Planning Commission (Commissioner, 1942–1960)
 New York State Power Authority (Chairman, 1954–1962)
 New York's World Fair (President, 1960–1966)
 Office of the Governor of New York (Special Advisor on Housing, 1974–1975)

Influence
During the 1920s, Moses sparred with Franklin D. Roosevelt, then head of the Taconic State Park Commission, who favored the prompt construction of a parkway through the Hudson Valley. Moses succeeded in diverting funds to his Long Island parkway projects (the Northern State Parkway, the Southern State Parkway and the Wantagh State Parkway), although the Taconic State Parkway was later completed as well. Moses helped build Long Island's Meadowbrook State Parkway. It was the first fully divided limited access highway in the world.

Moses was a highly influential figure in the initiation of many of the reforms that restructured New York state's government during the 1920s. A 'Reconstruction Commission' headed by Moses produced a highly influential report that provided recommendations that would largely be adopted, including the consolidation of 187 existing agencies under eighteen departments, a new executive budget system, and the four-year term limit for the governorship.

WPA swimming pools 
During the Depression, Moses, along with Mayor Fiorello H. La Guardia, was especially interested in creating new pools and other bathing facilities, such as those in Jacob Riis Park, Jones Beach, and Orchard Beach. He devised a list of 23 pools around the city. The pools would be built using funds from the Works Progress Administration (WPA), a federal agency created as part of the New Deal to combat the Depression's negative effects.

Eleven of these pools were to be designed concurrently and open in 1936. These comprised ten pools at Astoria Park, Betsy Head Park, Crotona Park, Hamilton Fish Park, Highbridge Park, Thomas Jefferson Park, McCarren Park, Red Hook Park, Jackie Robinson Park, and Sunset Park, as well as a standalone facility at Tompkinsville Pool. Moses, along with architects Aymar Embury II and Gilmore David Clarke, created a common design for these proposed aquatic centers. Each location was to have distinct pools for diving, swimming, and wading; bleachers and viewing areas; and bathhouses with locker rooms that could be used as gymnasiums. The pools were to have several common features, such as a minimum  length, underwater lighting, heating, filtration, and low-cost construction materials. To fit the requirement for cheap materials, each building would be built using elements of the Streamline Moderne and Classical architectural styles. The buildings would also be near "comfort stations", additional playgrounds, and spruced-up landscapes.

Construction for some of the 11 pools began in October 1934. By mid-1936, ten of the eleven WPA-funded pools were completed and were being opened at a rate of one per week. Combined, the facilities could accommodate 66,000 swimmers.  The eleven WPA pools were considered for New York City landmark status in 1990. Ten of the pools were designated as New York City landmarks in 2007 and 2008.

Moses allegedly fought to keep African American swimmers out of his pools and beaches. One subordinate remembers Moses saying the pools should be kept a few degrees colder, allegedly because Moses believed African Americans did not like cold water.

Water crossings

Triborough Bridge

Although Moses had power over the construction of all New York City Housing Authority public housing projects and headed many other entities, it was his chairmanship of the Triborough Bridge Authority that gave him the most power.

The Triborough Bridge (later officially renamed the Robert F. Kennedy Bridge) opened in 1936, connecting the Bronx, Manhattan, and Queens via three separate spans. Language in its Authority's bond contracts and multi-year Commissioner appointments made it largely impervious to pressure from mayors and governors. While New York City and New York State were perpetually strapped for money, the bridge's toll revenues amounted to tens of millions of dollars a year. The Authority was thus able to raise hundreds of millions of dollars by selling bonds, a method also used by the Port Authority of New York and New Jersey to fund large public construction projects. Toll revenues rose quickly as traffic on the bridges exceeded all projections. Rather than pay off the bonds, Moses used the revenue to build other toll projects, a cycle that would feed on itself.

Brooklyn–Battery link
In the late 1930s a municipal controversy raged over whether an additional vehicular link between Brooklyn and Lower Manhattan should be built as a bridge or a tunnel. Bridges can be wider and cheaper to build, but taller and longer bridges use more ramp space at landfall than tunnels do. A "Brooklyn Battery Bridge" would have decimated Battery Park and physically encroached on the financial district, and for this reason, the bridge was opposed by the Regional Plan Association, historical preservationists, Wall Street financial interests, property owners, various high society people, construction unions, the Manhattan borough president, Mayor Fiorello LaGuardia, and governor Herbert H. Lehman. Despite this, Moses favored a bridge, which could both carry more automobile traffic and serve as a higher visibility monument than a tunnel. LaGuardia and Lehman as usual had little money to spend, in part due to the Great Depression, while the federal government was running low on funds after recently spending $105 million ($1.8 billion in 2016) on the Queens-Midtown Tunnel and other City projects and refused to provide any additional funds to New York. Awash in funds from Triborough Bridge tolls, Moses deemed that money could only be spent on a bridge. He also clashed with the chief engineer of the project, Ole Singstad, who preferred a tunnel instead of a bridge.

Only a lack of a key federal approval thwarted the bridge project. President Roosevelt ordered the War Department to assert that bombing a bridge in that location would block East River access to the Brooklyn Navy Yard upstream. Thwarted, Moses dismantled the New York Aquarium on Castle Clinton and moved it to Coney Island in Brooklyn, where it grew much bigger. This was in apparent retaliation, based on specious claims that the proposed tunnel would undermine Castle Clinton's foundation. He also attempted to raze Castle Clinton itself, the historic fort surviving only after being transferred to the federal government. Moses now had no other option for a trans-river crossing than to build a tunnel. He commissioned the Brooklyn–Battery Tunnel (now officially the Hugh L. Carey Tunnel), a tunnel connecting Brooklyn to Lower Manhattan. A 1941 publication from the Triborough Bridge and Tunnel Authority claimed that the government had forced them to build a tunnel at "twice the cost, twice the operating fees, twice the difficulty to engineer, and half the traffic," although engineering studies did not support these conclusions, and a tunnel may have held many of the advantages Moses publicly tried to attach to the bridge option.

This had not been the first time Moses pressed for a bridge over a tunnel. He had tried to upstage the Tunnel Authority when the Queens-Midtown Tunnel was being planned. He had raised the same arguments, which failed due to their lack of political support.

Post-war influence of urban development and projects

Moses's power increased after World War II after Mayor LaGuardia retired and a series of successors consented to almost all of his proposals. Named city "construction coordinator" in 1946 by Mayor William O'Dwyer, Moses became New York City's de facto representative in Washington. Moses was also given powers over public housing that had eluded him under LaGuardia. When O'Dwyer was forced to resign in disgrace and was succeeded by Vincent R. Impellitteri, Moses was able to assume even greater behind-the-scenes control over infrastructure projects. One of Moses's first steps after Impellitteri took office was halting the creation of a citywide Comprehensive Zoning Plan underway since 1938 that would have curtailed his nearly unlimited power to build within the city and removed the Zoning Commissioner from power in the process. Moses was also empowered as the sole authority to negotiate in Washington for New York City projects. By 1959, he had overseen construction of 28,000 apartment units on hundreds of acres of land. In clearing the land for high-rises in accordance with the towers in the park concept, which at that time was seen as innovative and beneficial by leaving more grassy areas between high-rises, Moses sometimes destroyed almost as many housing units as he built.

From the 1930s to the 1960s, Robert Moses was responsible for the construction of the Triborough, Marine Parkway, Throgs Neck, Bronx-Whitestone, Henry Hudson, and Verrazzano-Narrows Bridges. His other projects included the Brooklyn-Queens Expressway and Staten Island Expressway (together constituting most of Interstate 278); the Cross-Bronx Expressway; many New York State parkways; and other highways. Federal interest had shifted from parkway to freeway systems, and the new roads mostly conformed to the new vision, lacking the landscaping or the commercial traffic restrictions of the pre-war highways. He was the mover behind Shea Stadium and Lincoln Center, and contributed to the United Nations headquarters.

Moses had influence outside the New York area as well. Public officials in many smaller American cities hired him to design freeway networks in the 1940s and early 1950s. For example, Portland, Oregon hired Moses in 1943; his plan included a loop around the city center, with spurs running through neighborhoods. Of this plan, only I-405, its links with I-5, and the Fremont Bridge were built.

Moses knew how to drive an automobile, but he did not have a valid driver's license. Moses's highways in the first half of the 20th century were parkways—curving, landscaped "ribbon parks" that were intended to be pleasures to travel as well as "lungs for the city"—though the Post–World War II economic expansion and notion of the automotive city brought freeways, most notably in the form of the vast, federally funded Interstate Highway System network.

Brooklyn Dodgers
When Brooklyn Dodgers owner Walter O'Malley sought to replace the outdated and dilapidated Ebbets Field, he proposed building a new stadium near the Long Island Rail Road on the corner of Atlantic Avenue and Flatbush Avenue (next to the present-day Barclays Center, home of the NBA Brooklyn Nets). O'Malley urged Moses to help him secure the property through eminent domain, but he refused, having already decided to build a parking garage on the site. Moreover, O'Malley's proposal — to have the city acquire the property for several times as much as he had originally said he was willing to pay — was rejected by both pro- and anti-Moses officials, newspapers, and the public as an unacceptable government subsidy of a private business enterprise.

Moses envisioned New York's newest stadium being built in Queens' Flushing Meadows on the former (and as it turned out, future) site of the World's Fair, where it would eventually host all three of the city's major league teams of the day. O'Malley vehemently opposed this plan, citing the team's Brooklyn identity. Moses refused to budge, and after the 1957 season the Dodgers left for Los Angeles and the New York Giants left for San Francisco. Moses was later able to build the 55,000-seat multi-purpose Shea Stadium on the site; construction ran from October 1961 to its delayed completion in April 1964. The stadium attracted an expansion franchise: the New York Mets, who played at Shea until 2008, when the stadium was demolished and replaced with Citi Field. The New York Jets football team also played its home games at Shea from 1964 until 1983, after which the team moved its home games to the Meadowlands Sports Complex in New Jersey.

End of the Moses era

Moses's reputation began to fade during the 1960s. Around this time, Moses's political acumen began to fail him, as he unwisely picked several controversial political battles he could not possibly win. For example, his campaign against the free Shakespeare in the Park program received much negative publicity, and his effort to destroy a shaded playground in Central Park to make way for a parking lot for the expensive Tavern-on-the-Green restaurant earned him many enemies among the middle-class voters of the Upper West Side.

The opposition reached a climax over the demolition of Pennsylvania Station, which many attributed to the "development scheme" mentality cultivated by Moses even though it was the impoverished Pennsylvania Railroad that was actually responsible for the demolition. This casual destruction of one of New York's greatest architectural landmarks helped prompt many city residents to turn against Moses's plans to build a Lower Manhattan Expressway, which would have gone through Greenwich Village and what is now SoHo. This plan and the Mid-Manhattan Expressway both failed politically. One of his most vocal critics during this time was the urban activist Jane Jacobs, whose book The Death and Life of Great American Cities was instrumental in turning opinion against Moses's plans; the city government rejected the expressway in 1964.

Moses's power was further eroded by his association with the 1964 New York World's Fair. His projections for attendance of 70 million people for this event proved wildly optimistic, and generous contracts for fair executives and contractors made matters worse economically. Moses's repeated and forceful public denials of the fair's considerable financial difficulties in the face of evidence to the contrary eventually provoked press and governmental investigations, which found accounting irregularities. In his organization of the fair, Moses's reputation was now undermined by the same personal character traits that had worked in his favor in the past: disdain for the opinions of others and high-handed attempts to get his way in moments of conflict by turning to the press. The fact that the fair was not sanctioned by the Bureau of International Expositions (BIE), the worldwide body supervising such events, would be devastating to the success of the event. Moses refused to accept BIE requirements, including a restriction against charging ground rents to exhibitors, and the BIE in turn instructed its member nations not to participate. The United States had already staged the sanctioned Century 21 Exposition in Seattle in 1962. According to the rules of the organization, no one nation could host more than one fair in a decade. The major European democracies, as well as Canada, Australia, and the Soviet Union, were all BIE members and they declined to participate, instead reserving their efforts for Expo 67 in Montreal.

After the World's Fair debacle, New York City mayor John Lindsay, along with Governor Nelson Rockefeller, sought to direct toll revenues from the Triborough Bridge and Tunnel Authority's (TBTA) bridges and tunnels to cover deficits in the city's then financially ailing agencies, including the subway system. Moses opposed this idea and fought to prevent it. Lindsay then removed Moses from his post as the city's chief advocate for federal highway money in Washington.

The legislature's vote to fold the TBTA into the newly created Metropolitan Transportation Authority (MTA) could have led to a lawsuit by the TBTA bondholders. Since the bond contracts were written into state law, it was unconstitutional to impair existing contractual obligations, as the bondholders had the right of approval over such actions. However, the largest holder of TBTA bonds, and thus agent for all the others, was the Chase Manhattan Bank, headed then by David Rockefeller, the governor's brother. No suit was filed. Moses could have directed TBTA to go to court against the action, but having been promised a role in the merged authority, Moses declined to challenge the merger. On March 1, 1968, the TBTA was folded into the MTA and Moses gave up his post as chairman of the TBTA. He eventually became a consultant to the MTA, but its new chairman and the governor froze him out—the promised role did not materialize, and for all practical purposes Moses was out of power.

Moses had thought he had convinced Nelson Rockefeller of the need for one last great bridge project, a span crossing Long Island Sound from Rye to Oyster Bay. Rockefeller did not press for the project in the late 1960s through 1970, fearing public backlash among suburban Republicans would hinder his re-election prospects. A 1972 study found the bridge was fiscally prudent and could be environmentally manageable (according to the comparatively low environmental impact parameters of that period), but the anti-development sentiment was now insurmountable and in 1973 Rockefeller canceled plans for the bridge.

The Power Broker

Moses's image suffered a further blow in 1974 with the publication of The Power Broker, a Pulitzer Prize–winning biography by Robert A. Caro. Caro's 1,200-page opus (edited down from 2,000 or so pages) showed Moses generally in a negative light; essayist Phillip Lopate writes that "Moses's satanic reputation with the public can be traced, in the main, to ... Caro's magnificent biography". For example, Caro describes Moses's lack of sensitivity in the construction of the Cross-Bronx Expressway, and how he disfavored public transit. Much of Moses's reputation is attributable to Caro, whose book won both the Pulitzer Prize in Biography in 1975 and the Francis Parkman Prize (which is awarded by the Society of American Historians), and was named one of the 100 greatest non-fiction books of the twentieth century by the Modern Library. Upon its publication, Moses denounced the biography in a 23-page statement, to which Caro replied to defend his work's integrity.

Caro's depiction of Moses's life gives him full credit for his early achievements, showing, for example, how he conceived and created Jones Beach and the New York State Park system, but also shows how Moses's desire for power came to be more important to him than his earlier dreams. Moses is blamed for having destroyed more than a score of neighborhoods by building 13 expressways across New York City and by building large urban renewal projects with little regard for the urban fabric or for human scale. Yet the author is more neutral in his central premise: the city would have developed much differently without Moses. Other U.S. cities were doing the same thing as New York in the 1940s, 1950s, and 1960s; Boston, San Francisco, and Seattle, for instance, each built highways straight through their downtown areas. The New York City architectural intelligentsia of the 1940s and 1950s, who largely believed in such proponents of the automobile as Le Corbusier and Mies van der Rohe, had supported Moses. Many other cities, like Newark, Chicago, and St. Louis, also built massive, unattractive public housing projects. However, Caro also points out that Moses demonstrated racist tendencies.  These allegedly included opposing black World War II veterans to move into a residential complex specifically designed for these veterans,  and purportedly trying to make swimming pool water cold in order to drive away potential African American residents in white neighborhoods.

People had come to see Moses as a bully who disregarded public input, but until the publication of Caro's book, they had not known many details of his private life—for instance, that his brother Paul had spent much of his life in poverty. Paul, whom Caro interviewed shortly before the former's death, claimed Robert had exerted undue influence on their mother to change her will in Robert's favor shortly before her death. Caro notes that Paul was on bad terms with their mother over a long period and she may have changed the will of her own accord, and implies that Robert's subsequent treatment of Paul may have been legally justifiable but was morally questionable.

Death

During the last years of his life, Moses concentrated on his lifelong love of swimming and was an active member of the Colonie Hill Health Club.

Moses died of heart disease on July 29, 1981, at the age of 92 at Good Samaritan Hospital in West Islip, New York.

Moses was of Jewish origin and raised in a secularist manner inspired by the Ethical Culture movement of the late 19th century. He was a convert to Christianity and was interred in a crypt in an outdoor community mausoleum in Woodlawn Cemetery in The Bronx, New York City following services at St. Peter's by-the-Sea Episcopal Church in Bay Shore, New York.

Legacy

Various locations and roadways in New York State bear Moses's name. These include two state parks, Robert Moses State Park – Thousand Islands in Massena, New York and Robert Moses State Park – Long Island, the Robert Moses Causeway on Long Island, and the Robert Moses Niagara Power Plant in Lewiston, New York. The Niagara Scenic Parkway in Niagara Falls, New York was originally named the Robert Moses State Parkway in his honor; its name was changed in 2016. The Moses-Saunders Power Dam in Massena, New York also bears his name. Moses also has a school named after him in North Babylon, New York on Long Island; there is also a Robert Moses Playground in New York City. There are other signs of the surviving appreciation held for him by some circles of the public. A statue of Moses was erected next to the Village Hall in his long-time hometown, Babylon Village, New York.

By the time he left office, he had built 658 playgrounds in New York City alone, plus  of parkways and 13 bridges. However, the proportion of public benefit corporations is greater in New York than in any other U.S. state, making them the prime mode of infrastructure building and maintenance in New York and accounting for 90% of the state's debt.

Appraisal

Criticism and The Power Broker
Moses's life was most famously characterized in Robert Caro's 1974 award-winning biography The Power Broker. 

The book highlighted his practice of starting large projects well beyond any funding approved by the New York State legislature, with the knowledge that it would eventually have to pay for the rest to avoid looking as having failed to review the project properly (a tactic known as ). He was also characterized as using his political power to benefit cronies, including a case in which he secretly shifted the planned route of the Northern State Parkway large distances to avoid impinging on the estates of the rich, but told owners of the family farms who lost land and sometimes their livelihood that it was based on "engineering considerations." The book also charged that Moses libeled other officials who opposed him, attempting to have them removed from office by calling some of them communists during the Red Scare. The biography further notes that Moses fought against schools and other public needs in favor of his preference for parks.

Moses's critics charge that he preferred automobiles over people. They point out that he displaced hundreds of thousands of residents in New York City and destroyed traditional neighborhoods by building multiple expressways through them. The projects contributed to the ruin of the South Bronx and the amusement parks of Coney Island, caused the Brooklyn Dodgers and the New York Giants Major League baseball teams to relocate to Los Angeles and San Francisco respectively, and precipitated the decline of public transport from disinvestment and neglect. His building of expressways also hindered the proposed expansion of the New York City Subway from the 1930s to well into the 1960s because the parkways and expressways that were built replaced, at least to some extent, the planned subway lines. The 1968 Program for Action (which was never completed) was hoped to counter that. Other critics charge that he precluded the use of public transit, which would have allowed non-car-owners to enjoy the elaborate recreation facilities he built.

Racism
Caro's The Power Broker also accused Moses of building low bridges across his parkways in order to "restrict the use of state parks by poor and lower-middle-class families," who did not own cars and would arrive by bus, and of discouraging Black people in particular from visiting Jones Beach, the centerpiece of the Long Island state park system, by such measures as making it difficult for Black groups to get permits to park buses, even if they came anyway (by other roads), and assigning Black lifeguards to "distant, less developed beaches" instead. While the exclusion of commercial vehicles and the use of low bridges where appropriate were standard on earlier parkways, where they had been instituted for aesthetic reasons, Moses appears to have made greater use of low bridges, which his aide Sidney Shapiro said was done to make it more difficult for future legislators to allow commercial vehicles. Caro's claims have been questioned since buses in fact use the parkways. Woolgar and Cooper refer to the claim about bridges as an "urban legend." Joerges describes it as "counterfactual".

Moses vocally opposed allowing Black war veterans to move into Stuyvesant Town, a Manhattan residential development complex created to house World War II veterans. In response to the biography, Moses defended his forced displacement of poor and minority communities as an inevitable part of urban revitalization: "I raise my stein to the builder who can remove ghettos without moving people as I hail the chef who can make omelets without breaking eggs."

Additionally, there were allegations that Moses selectively chose locations for recreational facilities based on the racial compositions of neighborhood, such as when he selected sites for eleven pools that opened in 1936. According to one author, Moses purposely placed some pools in neighborhoods with mainly-white populations to deter African Americans from using them, and other pools intended for African Americans, such as the one in Colonial Park, now Jackie Robinson Park, were placed in inconvenient locations. Another author wrote that of 255 playgrounds built in the 1930s under Moses's tenure, two were in largely-Black neighborhoods. Caro wrote that close associates of Moses had claimed they could keep African Americans from using the Thomas Jefferson Pool, in then-predominantly-white East Harlem, by making the water too cold. However, no other source has corroborated the claim that heaters in any particular pool were deactivated or not included in the pool's design.

Reappraisal
Some scholars have attempted to rehabilitate Moses's reputation by contrasting the scale of works with the high cost and the slow speed of public works in the decades following his era. The peak of Moses's construction occurred during the economic duress of the Great Depression, and despite the era's woes, Moses's projects were completed in a timely fashion and have been reliable public works since then, which compares favorably to the delays that New York City officials have had in redeveloping the Ground Zero site of the former World Trade Center or to the delays and technical problems surrounding the Second Avenue Subway and Boston's Big Dig project.

Three major exhibits in 2007 prompted a reconsideration of his image among some intellectuals, as they acknowledged the magnitude of his achievements. According to the Columbia University architectural historian Hilary Ballon and colleagues, Moses deserves a better reputation. They argue that his legacy is more relevant than ever and that people take the parks, playgrounds, and housing that Moses built, now generally binding forces in those areas, for granted even if the old-style New York neighborhood was of no interest to Moses himself. Moreover, were it not for Moses's public infrastructure and his resolve to carve out more space, New York might not have been able to recover from the blight and flight of the 1970s and the 1980s to become today's economic magnet.

"Every generation writes its own history," said Kenneth T. Jackson, a historian of New York City to the New York Times in 2007. "It could be that The Power Broker was a reflection of its time: New York was in trouble and had been in decline for 15 years. Now, for a whole host of reasons, New York is entering a new time, a time of optimism, growth and revival that hasn't been seen in half a century. And that causes us to look at our infrastructure," said Jackson. "A lot of big projects are on the table again, and it kind of suggests a Moses era without Moses," he added. Politicians are also reconsidering the Moses legacy; in a 2006 speech to the Regional Plan Association on downstate transportation needs, New York Governor-elect Eliot Spitzer stated a biography of Moses written today might be called At Least He Got It Built: "That's what we need today. A real commitment to get things done."

In popular culture
 Moses is the subject of a satirical song by John Forster entitled "The Ballad of Robert Moses", included on his 1997 album Helium.
 In season 3, episode 2 of the television series Unbreakable Kimmy Schmidt, "Kimmy's Roommate Lemonades", Kimmy is shown considering attendance at several New York City colleges with comedic names based on the city's culture and history.  One was originally called "Robert Moses College for Whites", and its sign has been altered by crossing out "Whites" and replacing it with the word "Everyone".
 Moses is the subject of a critical song by NYHC band Sick of It All entitled "Robert Moses was a racist", included on their 2018 album Wake the sleeping dragon!.
 The band Bob Moses is named after Robert Moses.
 A fictionalized version of Moses is the main villain of The Unsleeping City, the third season of the web series Dimension 20.
 The character of Moses Randolph in Motherless Brooklyn is based on Robert Moses.
 At the beginning of the COVID pandemic, when many TV commentators, politicians and others worked from their homes, The New York Times noted the frequent placement of The Power Broker as a background element.
The 2021 film adaptation of West Side Story adds the historical context of New York City's urban gentrification in the 1950s. During the song "America", a group of Puerto Rican demonstrators appear, protesting their pending evictions, and one of them holds a sign condemning Robert Moses.
Moses is the protagonist in the 2022 play Straight Line Crazy by David Hare.

See also
Car culture
Federal Power Commission v. Tuscarora Indian Nation
Modernist architecture
Transportation in New York City
Urban sprawl
M. Justin Herman
Edward J. Logue
Edmund Bacon (architect)
Austin Tobin – Port Authority Executive Director
Long Island State Parkway Police
New York State Park Police
New York State Police

References

Bibliography

Other sources

Exhibits:
"The Triborough Bridge: Robert Moses and the Automobile Age" exhibit at the New York Transit Museum
"Robert Moses and the Modern City" exhibit February 2007 thru May 2007 at 3 New York City museums
"Looking Back at Moses" a trio of New York museums
Photographs from the Museum of the City of New York exhibit

Papers:
Robert Moses papers, 1912–1980, held by the Manuscripts and Archives Division, New York Public Library
Online letters of Moses
Moses's response to Robert Caro's accusations

Archival Audio:
 The Robert Moses Collection at The WNYC Archives

Interviews:
1973 audio interview of Robert Moses by Don Swaim of CBS Radio, RealAudio at Wired for Books.org
Robert A. Caro talks to Richard D. Heffner about Robert Moses on the Open Mind, 1998

External links

 Robert Moses Papers (MS 360). Manuscripts and Archives, Yale University Library.
 

 
1888 births
1981 deaths
 Central Park
Politicians from New Haven, Connecticut
Politicians from New York City
Secretaries of State of New York (state)
New York City Department of Parks and Recreation
New York (state) Republicans
American civil servants
American Ashkenazi Jews
American people of German-Jewish descent
Converts to Christianity from Judaism
Jews and Judaism in New York City
Land owners and developers in Rockaway, Queens
Al Smith
Burials at Woodlawn Cemetery (Bronx, New York)
Yale University alumni
Columbia Graduate School of Arts and Sciences alumni
Ethical Culture Fieldston School alumni
Alumni of Wadham College, Oxford
20th-century American politicians